Altötting (Bavarian: Oidäding) is a Landkreis (district) in Bavaria, Germany. It is bounded by (from the east and clockwise) Austria and the Bavarian districts of Traunstein, Mühldorf and Rottal-Inn.

History 
Altötting was one of the original parts of Bavaria.  It was settled by Bavarian tribes shortly after the retreat of the Romans. During the rule of duke Tassilo III (748-788) the place of Ötting was mentioned for the first time (the towns of Altötting and Neuötting are derived from that place). Soon in the 9th century the region became a religious centre with famous churches and monasteries. In the 15th century it became a place of pilgrimage.

The district of Altötting was established in 1837.  Pope Benedict XVI was born here 1927 in the village of Marktl.

The hearts of many of the rulers of Bavaria are buried in the Chapel of Grace in the middle of the town square.

Geography 
The district is located in the alpine upland on the Austrian border. The main axis of the region is the river Inn, which crosses the district from west to east. It is joined by two large tributaries, the Alz coming from the south and the Salzach, which forms the eastern border of the district. In addition there are several smaller rivers and brooks. The district once was covered with deciduous forests, but is now mainly agriculturally used. However, there are some nature reserves along the lower Alz River and at the mouth of the Salzach River.

Coat of arms 
The coat of arms displays:
 left: the pilgrimage Chapel of Grace in the town of Altötting
 right: the blue and white checked pattern of Bavaria

Towns and municipalities

References

External links 

  (German)
 Unofficial website (German)

 
Districts of Bavaria